Clio Bay is the 1.8 km wide bay indenting for 1.7 km the west coast of Lavoisier Island in Biscoe Islands, Antarctica. It is formed as a result of the retreat of Lavoisier Island's ice cap in the early 21st century.

The feature is named after Clio, the muse of history in Greek mythology.

Location
British mapping in 1976.

Maps
 British Antarctic Territory. Scale 1:200000 topographic map. DOS 610 Series, Sheet W 66 66. Directorate of Overseas Surveys, UK, 1976
 Antarctic Digital Database (ADD). Scale 1:250000 topographic map of Antarctica. Scientific Committee on Antarctic Research (SCAR). Since 1993, regularly upgraded and updated

Notes

References
 Clio Bay. SCAR Composite Gazetteer of Antarctica
 Bulgarian Antarctic Gazetteer. Antarctic Place-names Commission. (details in Bulgarian, basic data in English)

External links
 Clio Bay. Copernix satellite image

Bays of Graham Land
Landforms of the Biscoe Islands
Bulgaria and the Antarctic